Iosune Murillo Elkano (born 14 May 1980) is a Spanish road cyclist. She represented her nation at the 2008 UCI Road World Championships.

References

External links
 Official website
 profile at Procyclingstats.com

1980 births
Spanish female cyclists
Living people
Place of birth missing (living people)
Cyclists from Navarre
People from Cuenca de Pamplona